The 2021 North East Lincolnshire Council election took place on 6 May 2021 to elect members of North East Lincolnshire Council in England. This was on the same day as other local elections. 14 seats were up for election, and the Conservatives retained overall control.

These elections were due to take place in 2020, but were postponed due to the COVID-19 pandemic.

Results

|-
| 
| Freedom Alliance
| align="right"| 0
| align="right"| 0
| align="right"| 0
| align="right"| 0
| align="right"| 0.00
| align="right"| 1.75
| align="right"| 502
| align="right"| +1.75
|-

Council composition
Following the last election in 2019, the composition of the council was:

After the election, the composition of the council was:

Ward results

Croft Baker

East Marsh

Only one seat was due to be contested, however a seat next due up for election in 2023 was also up for election due to a vacancy.

Freshney

Haverstoe

Heneage

Humberston and New Waltham

Immingham

Park

Scartho

Only one seat was due to be contested, however a seat next due up for election in 2022 was also up for election due to a vacancy.

Sidney Sussex

South

Yarborough

By-elections

Park

References

2021 English local elections
2021
2020s in Lincolnshire